The 1895 World Allround Speed Skating Championships took place at 23 and 24 February 1895 at the ice rink Mjøsen in Hamar, Norway. There was no defending champion. In 1894 no champion was declared because none of the skaters won three distances. Jaap Eden became the first skater to win two world titles.

Allround results 

  * = Fell
 NC = Not classified
 NF = Not finished
 NS = Not started
 DQ = Disqualified
Source: SpeedSkatingStats.com

Rules 
Four distances had to be skated: 500, 1500, 5000 and 10,000 m. One could earn the world title only by winning at least three of the four distances, otherwise the title would be vacant. The winner of the 500 and 1500 meter was decided by a skate off of the best four skaters of the distance. Silver and bronze medals were not awarded.

References 

World Allround Speed Skating Championships, 1895
1895 World Allround
World Allround, 1895
Sport in Hamar
1895 in Norway
February 1895 sports events